The 1919 Australasian Championships was a tennis tournament that took place on outdoor grass courts at the Double Bay Grounds in Sydney, Australia.  Due to World War I, the tournament was not held until early 1920, from 19 January to 24 January. It was the 12th edition of the Australian Championships (now known as the Australian Open), the 2nd held in Sydney, and the last Grand Slam tournament of 1919. The men's singles title was won by Algernon Kingscote.

Finals

Singles

 Algernon Kingscote defeated  Eric Pockley  6–4, 6–0, 6–3

Doubles
 Pat O'Hara Wood /  Ronald Thomas defeated  James Anderson /  Arthur Lowe 7–5, 6–1, 7–9, 3–6, 6–3

References

External links
 Australian Open official website

 
1920 in Australian tennis
1920
January 1920 sports events